Polina Arazi (born ) is an Israeli female former volleyball player, playing as an outside hitter. She was part of the Israel women's national volleyball team.

She competed at the 2011 Women's European Volleyball Championship.

References

External links

Israeli women's volleyball players
1978 births
Living people
Place of birth missing (living people)